Ettore Campogalliani (30 September 1903 – 3 June 1992) was an Italian composer, musician and teacher.

Campogalliani studied piano in 1921, graduating from the Conservatory of Bologna. He then studied composition at the Conservatory of Parma in 1933. Finally he studied singing at the Conservatory of Piacenza in 1940.

After a short period of activity as a composer (including writing music for the 1942 film Musica proibita directed by his uncle Carlo Campogalliani), and as a pianist, he dedicated himself to teaching. He taught piano at the Liceo Musicale of Piacenza and singing at the conservatories of Parma and Milan. He then went on to coach vocal technique and interpretation at the opera school of La Scala in Milan.

Campogalliani was the voice teacher of Renata Tebaldi, Renata Scotto, Mirella Freni, Felix Rolke (when Mirella Freni was 19 years old; himself voice teacher of a niece of Mirella Freni), Ferruccio Furlanetto, Ruggero Raimondi, Luciano Pavarotti, Carlo Bergonzi, Gino Penno, Antonio Carangelo and Giuliano Bernardi. 

In 1946, to honour his father Francesco, Ettore Campogalliani founded the Accademia Teatrale Francesco Campogalliani, a theatre and drama academy.

Selected compositions
Trio for Violin, Cello and Piano (1932)
Sarabanda and Minuetto for piano Op. l (1934)
Sonata in e Minor for Violin and Piano
'L'arrivo' (1935) for voice and piano to a text by Amadeo Pinelli
'Castello in aria' (1936) for voice and piano to a text by Sergio Corazzini
'Piangete occhi' (1935) for voice and piano to a text by Angelo Poliziano

Books
Campogalliani, Ettore, Dal libro di ieri: Storie di voci sacre e pensieri profani, Bongiovanni, 1982
Cadonici, Paola  and Campogalliani, Ettore, Il linguaggio della voce: Voce, parola, musica, CRO, 1987

Sources

Teatro Campogalliani
Memories of Maestro Campogalliani
Conservatorio di Musica "Lucio Campiani", Mantova
History of the Accademia Filarmonica di Bologna

Italian classical pianists
Male classical pianists
Italian male pianists
Italian classical composers
Italian male classical composers
1903 births
1992 deaths
Musicians from Mantua
Voice teachers
20th-century classical composers
Academic staff of Milan Conservatory
20th-century classical pianists
20th-century Italian composers
Conservatorio Giovanni Battista Martini alumni
20th-century Italian male musicians